Wet and messy fetishism (WAM), also known as sploshing, is a form of sexual fetishism whereby a person becomes aroused when copious amounts of a substance are applied to the naked skin, face, or to clothing. Several dozen websites are dedicated to WAM.

Many people with WAM fetishes are drawn to the tactile sensations of wet or messy substances against their skin. Other individuals simply prefer the visual appeal of others getting wet or messy with products that have different textures, consistencies and colours. A subject will often be pelted with cream pies (sometimes using shaving foam rather than real cream pie filling), have slime dumped on them, or sit on cakes. Another common theme is the pouring of substances inside clothing while it is being worn; clothing chosen for this can vary from swimsuits or underwear to full outfits. Normal street clothes, either casual or office wear, are commonly featured in WAM productions, but many other types of outfits, from wedding attire to industrial overalls or more specialist fetishwear such as PVC, latex, or leather items may be used. White items are particularly popular with some fans of this fetish.

Messy substances most commonly focused on by WAM participants include whipped cream, raw eggs, milk, lotion (see lotion play), paint, oil, mud, pudding, chocolate sauce, shaving foam,  hair conditioner, soap, custard, baked beans, treacle, ketchup, ice cream, peanut butter, slime, and cake batter, among others.

A fetish for bodily fluids such as feces, urine, vomit, semen, and female ejaculate is not considered part of WAM. The former three are typically considered coprophilia, urophilia, and emetophilia; urophilia is occasionally found in mainstream pornography; the other two are less common fetishes.

WAM fetish videos (made by both fans and commercial producers) may include nudity and sexual acts, while others may only feature fully clothed participants. Videos can frequently be seen on public video hosting sites like YouTube. Some of these videos are flagged but most of them remain available despite the sexual undertones, mainly because a large majority of wet and messy videos posted publicly do not include nudity and are therefore considered suitable for all audiences to view. Indeed, not only is much WAM video content indistinguishable in any easily defined sense from the kind of slapstick featured in mainstream entertainment, but scenes of slimings or pieings from the mainstream media are often compiled and marketed by producers towards a WAM fetishist target audience.

Crossover with other fetishes
There is some crossover between the wet and messy fetish and clothing destruction fetishes. Some WAM productions will see models start out fully dressed, usually in quite smart outfits such as formal dresses or suits; they will then be covered in messy substances, after which their messy clothes are cut up, typically with scissors, leaving them naked or nearly so.

WAM is sometimes also combined with bondage, where a subject is first restrained or chained up and then hosed down or messed up. Wet and Messy fetishism lends itself well to domination/submission role-playing. 

"Cake Sitting" (the act of deliberately sitting on a large cake, either clothed or nude) is often considered a sub-fetish in its own right, but may be linked to the crush fetish.  While participants who sit on cakes for pleasure will do so for the tactile sensory experience, or as part of submissive role-playing, those who enjoy watching the act will often focus specifically on the crushing of the dessert as a visual stimulus for a sexual reaction.  Cake sitting as a fully clothed WAM activity can also form just part of the overall messing up of a participant, along with other methods of application of messy substances.

Psychology
No conclusive research has been conducted into the psychology behind the fetish; however, it is not uncommon for fetishists to have had interest in the sensations of messy play since their formative years (age 3–4) with a sexual element manifesting at the onset of puberty. For many, the simple breaking of taboos—doing what one was told not to as a child—brings about a sense of personal liberation. In any form, the fetish is about sensual stimulation, whether visual, tactile, or otherwise.

One unproven theory is that individuals drawn to WAM have low tactile sensitivity, which is increased and intensified by wet substances acting as a lubricant under applied pressure or friction. "Messy play" is a common clinical therapy used in treating hypo-tactile patients (mostly pediatric cases) to give them an outlet and appropriate time and place to engage in mess-making.

Another aspect is the link to other fetishes, as some wet and messy play is done in a submissive or dominating way and has possible links to BDSM, the emphasis being on the humiliation of the victim, although this is often mitigated or negated by the victim taking it in good humour. The dominant partner inflicting the mess can also be an object of attraction as an assertive figure of playful mischief.

In media
The popular sex column Savage Love has mentioned WAM. In one article, there was a reply to a letter from the roommate of someone who masturbates with condiments, possibly for fetishistic purposes. Daniel Savage, the writer of Savage Love, did not condemn the use of condiments in that incident, but, instead, only chided the fetishist for using condiments that were later used by others.

See also

Food play
Lotion play
Mud wrestling
Mysophilia
Saliromania
Slapstick
Splosh!
Wet T-shirt contest
Wetlook

References

External links 
 

The Ultimate Messy Directory

Splat! An Introduction to Sploshing and Food Play

Paraphilias
Sexual fetishism
Pornography